Apomyelois decolor, the Caribbean dried fruit moth, is a species of snout moth in the genus Apomyelois. It was described by Philipp Christoph Zeller in 1881. It is found in France, Florida, the Antilles, Central America and South America.

The wingspan is 19–30 mm. The forewings are dark grayish fuscous with some white powdering in the basal area and considerably more in the median area from slightly above inner margin and in the outer area between the subterminal line and the termen. The hindwings are smoky white to pale smoky fuscous.

The larvae have been recorded in fruits of Annona squamosa, Ceratonia siliqua and 
Hymenaea courbaril.

References

Moths described in 1881
Phycitini
Moths of Europe
Moths of North America
Moths of South America